Nuyts may refer to:

People
 Pieter Nuyts (1598–1655), Dutch explorer and diplomat
 Pieter Nuyts (writer) (1640–1709), Dutch poet and playwright

Places
 Nuyts Archipelago (disambiguation), places associated with the island group in South Australia
 Nuyts Land District, cadastral division of Western Australia
 Nuyts Reef, island in South Australia
Nuyts Reef Conservation Park, a protected area in South Australia

See also
 Nuytsia (disambiguation)
 Nuytsland Nature Reserve, Western Australia
 Pieter Nuyts (disambiguation)